Kim Yong-Hee  (born October 15, 1978) is a South Korean football player who last played for Arema Indonesia (ISL) in the Indonesian Super League.

He previously played professionally in the K-League for Jeonbuk Hyundai Motors, Gwangju Sangmu Bulsajo, Busan I'Park and Seongnam Ilhwa Chunma, before first stepping down to the semi-professional National League at the beginning of 2009 by signing for Gangneung City FC. In mid-2009 he moved to Incheon Korail and spent six months with the club before signing a contract in March 2010 with Indonesian Super League side Persiba Balikpapan.

Club career statistics

References

External links
 

1978 births
Living people
Association football midfielders
South Korean footballers
South Korean expatriate footballers
Seongnam FC players
Busan IPark players
Gimcheon Sangmu FC players
Jeonbuk Hyundai Motors players
Gangneung City FC players
Daejeon Korail FC players
Persiba Balikpapan players
Sriwijaya F.C. players
Arema F.C. players
K League 1 players
Korea National League players
Liga 1 (Indonesia) players
Expatriate footballers in Indonesia
South Korean expatriate sportspeople in Indonesia
Chung-Ang University alumni